Nelson Kerr Hopkins (March 2, 1816 in Williamsville, Erie County, New York – March 2, 1904) was an American lawyer and politician.

Life
Hopkins was the son of General Timothy Soveral Hopkins (b. ca. 1777) and Nancy Ann (Kerr) Hopkins (d. 1848). Hopkins attended Fredonia Academy and Genesee Wesleyan Seminary in preparation for college. 

He graduated from Union College in 1841, with Phi Beta Kappa honors and became a member of the Kappa Alpha Society there. He married Louise A. Pratt.

In 1865, Hopkins was President of the Common Council of Buffalo, New York having been an alderman since 1856. In 1867, he became Collector of Internal Revenue for the 30th District of New York.

Hopkins was New York State Comptroller from 1872 to 1875, elected in 1871 and 1873 on the Republican ticket.

Sources
 Political Graveyard
 New Political Graveyard
 Rep. state ticket in NYT on October 31, 1871
 Buffalo history

1816 births
1904 deaths
New York State Comptrollers
New York (state) lawyers
Politicians from Buffalo, New York
People from Williamsville, New York
New York (state) Republicans
Lawyers from Buffalo, New York